Buret District was a former administrative district in the Rift Valley Province of Kenya. Its capital town was Litein. The district had a population of 316,882 and an area of 955 km² . The district had two electoral constituencies: Konoin Constituency and Bureti Constituency .

In 2010, the district was split between Kericho County and Bomet County.

 
Former districts of Kenya